A total of 32 teams, 16 from West Asia and 16 from East Asia, competed in the 2011 AFC Champions League group stage. They included 30 direct entries and 2 winners of the qualifying play-off (one from West Asia and one from East Asia).

The draw for the group stage was held in Kuala Lumpur, Malaysia on 7 December 2010. The 32 teams were drawn into eight groups of four. Clubs from the same country may not be drawn into the same group.

In each group, teams played each other home-and-away in a round-robin format. The matchdays were 1–2 March, 15–16 March, 5–6 April, 19–20 April, 3–4 May, and 10–11 May 2011.

The winners and runners-up of each group advanced to the knockout stage.

Tiebreakers
The clubs are ranked according to points and tie breakers are in following order:
Greater number of points obtained in the group matches between the teams concerned;
Goal difference resulting from the group matches between the teams concerned;
Greater number of goals scored in the group matches between the teams concerned; (Away goals do not apply)
Goal difference in all the group matches;
Greater number of goals scored in all the group matches;
Kicks from the penalty mark if only two teams are involved and they are both on the field of play;
Fewer score calculated according to the number of yellow and red cards received in the group matches; (1 point for each yellow card, 3 points for each red card as a consequence of two yellow cards, 3 points for each direct red card, 4 points for each yellow card followed by a direct red card)
Drawing of lots.

Groups

Group A

Group B

Group C

Group D

Group E

Group F

Notes
Note 1: Nagoya Grampus v Al-Ain postponed from 15 March 2011 to 12 April 2011 due to earthquake in Japan.

Group G

Group H

Notes
Note 2: The Kashima Antlers v Sydney FC match was postponed from 16 March 2011 to 10 May 2011 due to the 2011 Tōhoku earthquake and tsunami in Japan. The return match, Sydney FC v Kashima Antlers, was brought forward from 10 May 2011 to 13 April 2011. All home matches of the Kashima Antlers were moved to the National Olympic Stadium in Tokyo as the Kashima Soccer Stadium in Kashima was damaged in the earthquake.

References

External links
AFC Champions League Official Page 

Group stage